Palau currently has no political parties.  It is a de facto non-partisan democracy since no law prevents the formation of political parties.

The Palau Nationalist Party, which functioned mainly as an electoral vehicle as opposed to an ideological movement, was founded for the 1996 elections. It is believed to no longer exist.

The Ta Belau Party was formed in 1987, and likewise is not currently active. It supported the presidency of Lazarus Salii, who committed suicide while in office in 1988.

See also
 Politics of Palau
 List of political parties by country

Palau
 
Palau

Political parties
Parties